Perugu may refer to 
 Curd (India), Indian word for yogurt
 Perugu Ramakrishna, Indian poet and writer
 Perugu Siva Reddy, Indian eye surgeon 

Surnames of Indian origin